is a Prefectural Natural Park in southern Ehime Prefecture, Japan. Established in 1964 and extended in 1972, the park spans the borders of the municipalities of Ainan and Uwajima.

See also
 National Parks of Japan

References

External links
  Detailed map of Sasayama Prefectural Natural Park

Parks and gardens in Ehime Prefecture
Uwajima, Ehime
Protected areas established in 1964
1964 establishments in Japan